Ismaël Bako (born 10 October 1995) is a Belgian professional basketball player for Virtus Bologna of the Italian Lega Basket Serie A (LBA) and the EuroLeague. He started his career in 2012 with Leuven Bears and transferred to Antwerp Giants in April 2017.

Professional career

Leuven
Bako started his career with Leuven Bears in the Pro Basketball League, making his debut in 2012. He was named the BLB Young Player of the Year of the 2016–17 season, after averaging 8.0 points and 4.1 rebounds per game.

Antwerp
In April 2017, he signed with Antwerp Giants. In the 2018–19 season, Bako won the Belgian Basketball Cup with the Giants. He was named the Belgian Cup Most Valuable Player. In the same season, the team reached the Final Four of the Basketball Champions League. Antwerp finished in third place after defeating Brose Bamberg in the third place game. Bako was named to the Basketball Champions League Star Lineup.

ASVEL
On 3 July 2019, Bako signed a two-year contract with LDLC ASVEL of the French LNB Pro A and the EuroLeague. He averaged 3.8 points and 2.1 rebounds per game. On June 12, 2020, he re-signed with the team for an additional season. During the 2020-21 season Bako averaged 5.6 points and 3.6 rebounds per game. He parted ways with the team on 11 July 2021.

Baxi Manresa
On July 24, 2021, Bako signed a two-year deal with Baxi Manresa of the Spanish Liga ACB. On September 5, 2021, won the Catalan League and won the MVP of the competition.

Virtus Bologna 
On July 13, 2022, Bako signed with Virtus Bologna of the Lega Basket Serie A and the EuroLeague. On 29 September 2022, after having ousted Olimpia Milano in the semifinals, Virtus won its third Supercup, defeating 72–69 Banco di Sardegna Sassari and achieving a back-to-back, following the 2021 trophy.

National team career
Bako has been a member of the Belgian national basketball team since 2016. At 21, Bako was the youngest member of the squad that played at EuroBasket 2017.

Awards and accomplishments

Club
Manresa
Lliga Catalana de Bàsquet: (2021)
ASVEL
 LNB Pro A: (2021)
French Cup: (2021)
Antwerp Giants
Belgian Cup: (2019)

Individual
Lliga Catalana de Bàsquet Final MVP: (2021)
All-Champions League First Team: (2019)
Belgian Cup MVP: (2019)
Belgian League Young Player of the Year (2017)

References

1995 births
Antwerp Giants players
ASVEL Basket players
Bàsquet Manresa players
Belgian expatriate basketball people in France
Belgian men's basketball players
Belgium national basketball players
Centers (basketball)
Leuven Bears players
Liga ACB players
Living people
Sportspeople from Leuven